Armbrust is a surname. Notable people with the surname include:

Barbara Armbrust (born 1963), Canadian rower
E. Virginia Armbrust Biological oceanographer
Heather Armbrust (born 1977), American professional bodybuilder
Orville Armbrust (1908–1967), Major League Baseball pitcher
Tobin Armbrust, American film producer

Fictional characters:
Armbrust, a character of the anime series Kiddy Grade
Crow Armbrust, character from hit video game series Trails.